United Nations Security Council Resolution 399, adopted unanimously on December 1, 1976, after examining the application of the Western Samoa for membership in the United Nations, the Council recommended to the General Assembly that Samoa be admitted.

See also
 List of United Nations member states
 List of United Nations Security Council Resolutions 301 to 400 (1971–1976)

References
Text of the Resolution at undocs.org

External links
 

 0399
 0399
 0399
December 1976 events
1976 in Samoa